Peter Bredsdorff-Larsen (born 11 August 1967) is as Danish handball coach, whom currently is head coach for Bjerringbro-Silkeborg and previous assistant coach for Denmark men's national handball team, together with head coach Gudmundur Gudmundsson.

References

Danish handball coaches
1967 births
Living people
Place of birth missing (living people)